= Helania =

Scientific classification
- Kingdom: Plantae
- Clade: Tracheophytes
- Clade: Angiosperms
- Clade: Eudicots
- Clade: Asterids
- Order: Apiales
- Family: Apiaceae
- Genus: Helania; L.Q.Zhao & Y.Z.Zhao
- Species: H. radialipetala

Binomial name
- Helania radialipetala L.Q.Zhao & Y.Z.Zhao

Genus of flowering plants

Helania is a genus of flowering plants in the family Apiaceae. It includes a single species, Helania radialipetala, a perennial native to Inner Mongolia.
